The Northern Michigan Soccer League is a high school boys and girls soccer league located in northern lower Michigan.  The league is made up of Division 3 and 4 member high schools. There are 12 members schools that are split into an east and west division. The league is a member of the Michigan High School Athletic Association (MHSAA).

Member schools

References

MSHAA League Membership, Northern Mich Soccer League (Boys)
MHSAA League Membership, Northern Mich Soccer League (Girls)
2017-18 MHSAA Enrollment List
Girls Soccer School Division List 2022-23

Michigan high school sports conferences
High school sports conferences and leagues in the United States
Soccer in Michigan
Soccer leagues in the United States